Frank Jones (September 15, 1832 – October 2, 1902) was a United States representative from New Hampshire representing the 1st Congressional District from 1875 to 1879. He was the mayor of Portsmouth, New Hampshire, in 1868 and 1869.

Biography
Frank Jones was born in Barrington, New Hampshire, on September 15, 1832. He attended the public schools in Barrington. He moved to Portsmouth in 1849 and became a successful merchant and brewer. He owned businesses in Portsmouth and South Boston, Massachusetts.

Jones, the mayor of Portsmouth in 1868 and 1869, elected as a Democrat to the Forty-fourth and Forty-fifth Congresses (March 4, 1875 – March 3, 1879) was not a candidate for renomination in 1878. He was the unsuccessful Democratic candidate for Governor of New Hampshire in 1880, losing to Republican Charles Henry Bell by only a few thousand votes, 44,432 to 40,813.

Later, Jones became involved with the Republican Party. He was disgusted over William Jennings Bryan's stand on Free Silver. He became interested in railroads and hotels. Jones rebuilt the stately Rockingham Hotel in Portsmouth and enlarged the Hotel Wentworth (now Wentworth-by-the-Sea) in New Castle. Also in Portsmouth, Jones built a mansion in the Second Empire style, with gardens and a horse track, completed in 1876. He was a presidential elector on the Republican ticket in 1900. He died in Portsmouth, New Hampshire, on October 2, 1902, and was buried in Harmony Grove Cemetery.

The Frank Jones Brewery was one of the largest producers of ale in the United States of America. In 1896, Jones' Portsmouth brewery produced about 250,000 barrels a year. In 1889, Jones put his company's stock on the market in London. The new company was incorporated on May 17, 1889. In 1950, the Frank Jones Brewery closed after 90 years.

Notes

References

1832 births
1902 deaths
Democratic Party members of the United States House of Representatives from New Hampshire
Mayors of Portsmouth, New Hampshire
American hoteliers
Politicians from Portsmouth, New Hampshire
People from Barrington, New Hampshire
19th-century American politicians
Burials in New Hampshire
19th-century American businesspeople